Pinoy Pop Superstar The Finalists is a compilation album released in 2005 featuring pop songs sung by the finalists of the first series of the Philippine TV show Pinoy Pop Superstar.

Track listing 

My Miracle (Raul Mitra) - The Finalists 
If You're Not the One (Daniel Bedingfield) - Micheal (4:10)
If You Don't Know Me By Now (Kenneth Gamble, Leon Huff) - Kristel (3:48) 
I Believe (Louie Biancanieno, Tamyra Gray, Samuel Waters) - Charmaine (5:04)
Home (Brian McKnight) - Brenan (4:20)
Through the Fire (David Foster, Tom Keane, Cynthia Weils) - MC (4:41)
It Might Be You (Dave Grusin, Alan & Marilyn Bergman) - Jonalyn (5:09)
My Miracle (Minus One) (Raul Mitra) - The Finalists (4:57)

2005 compilation albums
Pinoy Pop Superstar albums
GMA Music albums